Gilson is an unincorporated census-designated place in Knox County, Illinois, and is located southeast of Galesburg. As of the 2010 Census, its population was 190. It is part of the Galesburg Micropolitan Statistical Area. Gilson is located just east of Illinois Route 97 along Knox County Highway 12. The BNSF Railway runs through the town.

Geography

Gilson lies on a flat plain yielding to hills and valleys close to Haw Creek, west of the town. The area is agricultural with corn, soybeans, hay, wheat, and hogs as the major commodities raised. Small parcels of timber are also located in several areas near Gilson.

Demographics

References

External links 
NACo - Knox County

Census-designated places in Knox County, Illinois
Census-designated places in Illinois
Galesburg, Illinois micropolitan area